The Nacono were a Native American tribe from eastern Texas. Today they are part of the Caddo Nation of Oklahoma, a federally recognized tribe in Oklahoma.

History
The Nacono were part of the Hasinai branch of the Caddo Confederacy. They historically lived in villages along the Neches and Angelina Rivers, near present-day Cherokee and Houston Counties. Their environment includes mixed woodlands and savannas.

Early 18th century Spanish explorer Domingo Ramon recorded his observations of the Nocono in his 1716 Diary. He observed that the tribe lived near the San Francisco de los Neches Mission. Another Spanish explorer, Juan Antonio de la Pena wrote in 1721 that the Nacono village, that he called El Macono, was located five leagues below the Neches crossing. Together with 11 to 30 historical communities, including the Nadaco, the Hainai, and the Nacogdoche, the Nacono formed the Hasinai confederacy, which evolved into the greater Caddo confederacy. These confederacies are thought to have formed due to upheavals, depopulation, and migrations caused by European diseases and increased conflicts in the region in the 17th century.

Names
The tribe is also known as the Naconish, Macono, Naconome, and Nocono. The Lacane, Nacachau, Nacao (Nacau), Naconicho (Nacaniche), and Nakanawan peoples might have been divisions of the Nacono tribe.

Notes

References
 Bolton, Herbet E. The Hasinais: Southern Caddoans As Seen by the Earliest Europeans. Norman: University of Oklahoma Press, 2002. .
 Early, Ann M. "The Caddoes of the Trans-Mississippi South." McEwan, Bonnie G., ed. Indians of the Great Southeast: Historical Archaeology and Ethnohistory. Gainesville: University Press of Florida, 2000. 
 Sturtevant, William C., general editor and Raymond D. Fogelson, volume editor. Handbook of North American Indians: Southeast. Volume 14. Washington DC: Smithsonian Institution, 2004. .

External links
Nacono Indians, from Handbook of Texas Online

Caddoan peoples
Native American tribes in Texas
Native American history of Texas